The Români is a left tributary of the river Bistrița in Romania. It discharges into the Bistrița near Buhuși.

References

Rivers of Romania
Rivers of Neamț County
Rivers of Bacău County